Based in Karachi, Pakistan, the Social Policy and Development Centre (SPDC) is considered one of the pre-eminent economic policy research institutions in Pakistan and its services are much in demand by the government, civil society, academia, students and donors.

Established in April 1995, its research is aimed at raising the comprehension and awareness of the issues and problems of social development and influencing government policies. The Institution's research areas include monetary policy, fiscal policy, poverty, inequality, education, governance, gender, international trade and pro-poor macroeconomic policy. Major activities of SPDC include research and policy analysis, social sector database support, institutional analysis and development, project evaluation,  project monitoring and training & capacity Building of government employees, civil society members and academics.

Prof. Dr. Hafeez A. Pasha was the founder of this institute and currently, Muhammad Asif Iqbal is the Managing Director of SPDC.

External links
Social Policy and Development Centre

Politics of Pakistan
Research institutes in Pakistan
Political and economic think tanks based in Pakistan